Piotr Nowina-Konopka (born 27 May 1949 in Chorzów) is a Polish academic, politician and diplomat.

Academia
Konopka studied at the Sopot School of Economics, Gdańsk University, where he gained an MSc (1972) and a PhD (1978) in economics. From 1978-1989 he was assistant professor in the Foreign Trade Economics Institute, Gdańsk University, and from 1988-1989 was professor of catholic social science at Gdańsk Theological Institute. Konopka was Vice-Rector of the College of Europe, and head of the Warsaw/Natolin campus, from 1999-2004. In 2006 he has been a professor at Giedroyć College in Warsaw, where he teaches a course on Negotiations and Mediations in International Conflicts

Politics
From 1982-1989, Konopka was an assistant and spokesman for Lech Wałęsa, leader of the Solidarity movement, and served as the Solidarity spokesman at the 1989 Round Table Agreement negotiations. He has been a member of several international relations groups, and most recently served as European Union adviser to the Georgian Parliament in 2005-2006.

From 1991-2001 Konopka was a member of the Polish Sejm or Parliament, representing the Radom constituency. He served on several foreign affairs committees, and from 1998-1999 served as a secretary of State, and as deputy Head Negotiator on Poland's accession to the EU.

From November 2006 until 2010 he has been the co-Director of the ECPRD and Director for Relations with National Parliaments of the European Parliament.
From 2010 to 2013 he has been the Director of the European Parliament's Liaison Office With The US Congress. On June 19, 2013 he was appointed by Polish President Bronisław Komorowski as ambassador to the Holy See, as well as the ambassador at the Order of Malta. He ended his term in 2016.

Decorations
Officer of Polonia Restituta (Poland)
Chevalier de la Légion d'honneur (France)
Chevalier de l’Ordre national du Mérite (France)
German Cross of Merit, First Class (Das Verdienstkreuz I Klasse des Verdienstordens - Germany)

Works
 "European Centre for Parliamentary Research and Documentation (ECPRD):  A practical example of parliamentary cooperation in Europe. www.ecprd.org", by Piotr Nowina-Konopka, ECPRD Co-Director.

References

 Biographical note, in Polish.
Strona sejmowa posła III kadencji About Piotr Nowina-Konopka, from the Archive of Information on Deputies to the 3rd Sejm (1997–2000) (in Polish).
 European Parliament's Liaison Office With The US Congress

External links
 TV Świdnica: 7 June 2000 town-hall meeting with Piotr Nowina-Konopka on Poland's coming accession (as of 2000!) to the European Union.

1949 births
Living people
Solidarity (Polish trade union) activists
Officers of the Order of Polonia Restituta
Officers Crosses of the Order of Merit of the Federal Republic of Germany
Chevaliers of the Légion d'honneur
Knights of the Ordre national du Mérite
Academic staff of the College of Europe
Ambassadors of Poland to the Holy See